Fernando Gabriel Magallán (born 23 August 1997) is an Argentine professional footballer who plays as a midfielder for Defensores Unidos.

Career
Magallán came through the ranks of Defensores Unidos. After four appearances in the club's promotion-winning campaign of 2017–18 from Primera C Metropolitana, the midfielder returned to their reserves before manager Ángel Lema promoted him back into their senior set-up in March 2019. He made his Primera B Metropolitana debut during a goalless draw with Sacachispas on 2 March, prior to featuring later that month in fixtures with Almirante Brown, San Miguel and Justo José de Urquiza.

Career statistics
.

Honours
Defensores Unidos
Primera C Metropolitana: 2017–18

References

External links

1997 births
Living people
Place of birth missing (living people)
Argentine footballers
Association football midfielders
Primera C Metropolitana players
Primera B Metropolitana players
Defensores Unidos footballers